In nonlinear systems, the formalism of input-output stability is an important tool in studying the stability of interconnected systems since the gain of a system directly relates to how the norm of a signal increases or decreases as it passes through the system. The small-gain theorem gives a sufficient condition for finite-gain  stability of the feedback connection.  The small gain theorem was proved by George Zames in 1966.  It can be seen as a generalization of the Nyquist criterion to non-linear time-varying MIMO systems (systems with multiple inputs and multiple outputs).

Theorem. (This norm is typically the -norm, the size of the largest singular value of the transfer function over all frequencies. Any induced Norm will also lead to the same results).

Notes

References 
 H. K. Khalil, Nonlinear Systems, third edition, Prentice Hall, Upper Saddle River, New Jersey, 2002;
 C. A. Desoer, M. Vidyasagar, Feedback Systems: Input-Output Properties, second edition, SIAM, 2009.

See also 

 Input-to-state stability

Nonlinear control